Vojka can refer to:

 Vojka, Slovakia, village in the Trebišov District, Slovakia
 Vojka nad Dunajom, village in the Dunajská Streda District, Slovakia
 Vojka, Serbia, village near Stara Pazova, Vojvodina, Serbia